Lubbers is a Dutch patronymic surname ("Lubbert's son"). People with this name include:

Arend Lubbers (born 1931), American educator
Bob Lubbers (1922–2017), American comic strip and comic book artist  
Eva Lubbers (born 1992), Dutch sprinter and high jumper
Reinder Lubbers (born 1984), Dutch rower
Rudie Lubbers (born 1945), Dutch Olympic boxer
Ruud Lubbers (1939–2018), Prime Minister of the Netherlands from 1982 to 1994
Steven Lubbers (born 1953), Dutch cricketer
Teresa Lubbers (born 1939), American (Indiana) state senator

See also
Lubber, a species of grasshopper
Marinus van der Lubbe

Dutch-language surnames
Patronymic surnames